Eddie Tembo (born 1980) is a Zambian-born Scottish international shinty player from the village of Drumnadrochit.

He plays for Glenurquhart Shinty Club and was a member of the North Division One Championship side in 2008.  In 2008, he was selected for the Compromise rules Shinty/Hurling international with Ireland, in being so he became the first black person and first person of Zambian birth to represent Scotland at shinty.  He scored a point on his debut.

References

1980 births
Living people
Shinty players
Black British sportspeople
Zambian emigrants to the United Kingdom
Sportspeople from Highland (council area)